Warchild is an original novel written by Andrew Cartmel and based on the long-running British science fiction television series Doctor Who. It features the Seventh Doctor, Bernice, Chris, and Roz. This novel marks the conclusion of the "War trilogy" begun in Cat's Cradle: Warhead and Warlock, both of which were also by Cartmel. It is also the beginning of the "Psi Powers series".

Synopsis
The culmination of the previous two novels brings powerful forces ready to do battle all over the globe. Sucked into this is every-man Creed, whose normal life is disrupted by the super-powers his two sons seem to have.

External links
The Cloister Library - Warchild

1996 British novels
1996 science fiction novels
Virgin New Adventures
Novels by Andrew Cartmel
Seventh Doctor novels